The Akron-Summit County Public Library was founded in 1874, and operates Main Library on South High Street and South Main Street in downtown Akron, 18 branch libraries throughout the city of Akron and Summit County, the Akron Art Library (located on the Second Floor of Main Library), (and also at the Ellet Branch, the North Hill Branch, and the Odom Boulevard Branch), Project LEARN of Summit County Training Room (located on the First Floor of Main Library), Mobile Services (located on the Lower Floor of Main Library), and Project LEARN of Summit County (also located on the Lower Floor of Main Library). As of 2013, they have a lion cub mascot, named Paws.

Early Akron Libraries
An early predecessor of Akron Public Library (now known as Akron-Summit County Public Library) was the subscription library, the Akron Lyceum and Library Association Company formed in 1834 "for the promotion of literary pursuits." The Akron Library Association was formed in 1866 with a reading room in the Masonic Temple at South Howard Street and East Mill Street. Another predecessor of the Akron Public Library was the subscription library, the Akron Mechanic's Library, founded in 1870. In 1874 the Akron Library Association became the Akron Public Library.

Main Library History
On January 26, 1874, the Akron City Council established an ordinance to provide a free public library for Akron. On February 27, 1874, the Board of Trustees of the newly formed library met for the first time, with John R. Buchtel serving as the first board president. On March 1, 1874, the library officially opened to the public on the second floor of the Masonic Temple that was located on the corner of South Howard Street and East Mill Street. In October 1898, the recently established public library moved from the Masonic Temple to the second floor of the Everett Building on East Market Street and North Main Street.

The library grew rapidly and in August 1904, it moved to a new building funded by steel baron Andrew Carnegie who, in his retirement, provided funding for the building of 1,679 public Carnegie libraries in the United States. The building, at the corner of East Market Street and South High Street, is currently occupied by Brennan, Manna & Diamond, LLC. The library occupied this building until 1942 when its growing collection necessitated a move to larger quarters in the former Akron Beacon Journal building located at the corner of East Market Street and Summit Street.

As early as 1958, Library officials began discussions regarding the need for a new Main Library. Library Director Russell Munn felt strongly that this new building should be located on South Main Street. In 1962, a bond issue was legislated that would provide $3 million for the construction of the new library. Ground was broken on September 15, 1965, and the doors to the  Main Library on South Main Street and South High Street opened on March 24, 1969, and the dedication ceremony was held on April 27, 1969. On May 30, 1974, the name of the library was changed from the Akron Public Library to the Akron-Summit County Public Library when the library officially changed its organization from a school district and extension center library to a county district library.

Changing technology and expanding services to a growing population necessitated an expanded Main Library. In 1996, library officials began to plan for a new building to serve our community. Discussions took place about relocating the library, but the final decision was to remain at its present location and expand. Due to the nature of the expansion, all materials and staff were relocated to a temporary location. In May 2001, Main Library closed its doors and began the move to a former DIY store on East Tallmadge Avenue. For more than three years Main Library operated from this facility until October 10, 2004, when the newly renovated and expanded  Main Library on South High Street and South Main Street reopened its doors to the community and was rededicated.

About Main Library
Main Library is located at 60 South High Street, Akron, Ohio, 44326. It has several Special Divisions: Business, Government & Science (Science includes Science & Technology and Magazines & Newspapers); a  Children's Library; Culture & AV (Culture includes History & Humanities); Mobile Services; Special Collections (which includes Akron History, Summit County History, Ohio History & Genealogy, along with the microfilm machines); TechZone@Main; and Teen. The Main Library is a selective federal depository library.

Main Library also has 134 public access computers; black and white and color photocopiers/printers; laminating machines; scanners; fax machines and self–checkout kiosks (coming sometime in the near future); a 425-seat auditorium (located on the High Street level); a used bookstore (The Library Shop at Main) which is located on the second floor of Main Library and is operated by Friends of Main Library; and a café, the Stray Dog Café which is located at the rear South Main Street entrance of Main Library on the first floor. An interior glass block walkway leads to a 600-space parking garage owned by the City of Akron. Main Library also has an outdoor amphitheater and landscaped park outside of the library's rear South Main Street entrance.

Main Library Programming by floor

Materials and Services
Libraries have always been about more than books. Even during its formative years, the Akron Public Library offered books, reference service, and programming tailored to the needs of the community. When the Library was officially established in 1874, a large collection of German language books was established for the many German-speaking residents of the time. In 1929, a Readers’ Advisory service was established for the purpose of providing reference and programming service to groups and educational institutions. The Akron-Summit County Public Library continues to strive to provide a variety of materials in multiple formats to serve the needs of everyone in our community.  Books, recordings, research databases, programs for children and adults, classes, meeting rooms (located on the High Street level), foreign language collections, the Library Express Delivery Service (LEDS), Patent and Trademark Resource Center, business resources, and grantsmanship materials.

Special services that are available at Main Library include a Teen Program Room; a Children's Activity Room and Resource lab for Early Childhood Educators (RECE) (located in the Children's Library); a Microbusiness Center; the Akron Digital Media Center; a "Library of Things"; TechZone@Main (a makerspace); U.S. Passport and Notary services; a video studio; a recording studio, a green screen room, a media transfer center and Quiet Study Rooms.

Accessibility services available at Main Library include the Accessibility Zone with NLS talking book program and Braille books (both of which can be checked out), Large Print Keyboards and Magnisight CCTV, sensory inclusive items (sensory bags, weighted laptops and Quiet Zones). Social Stories (available through the KultureCity app at the Main Library and all 18 branch libraries), dementia inclusive resources, Same Day Select Service, Homebound Assistance (with the Library Express Home Delivery Service or LEDS), Vision Assistance (with large print books and audiobooks) and Hearing Assistance (with sign language interpreters). Service animals are also allowed at the Main Library, and all branch libraries. These are just a few of the many resources and services that are available through the Akron-Summit County Public Library.

Technology and Information Access
Access to information is the Library's primary goal, but the methods for achieving this goal have evolved significantly from the days of the card catalog.   Where customers once had to visit or call the Library to determine if the Library had the materials they were seeking, they may now access many of the Library's services from home online, or they can call and use the Same-Day Select Service.  The online catalog, research databases, internet access, community resources, Weather Center, and the Library's calendar of events may all be accessed remotely online through the Akron-Summit County Public Library's website. Along with these valuable resources, the Library also offers public access computers, laptop computers to borrow on a patron's library card, free Wi-Fi, free wireless hotspots and computer training in the Computer Lab to assist customers with the use and application of new and changing technology.

Services to Children and Teens
Serving children and teens is an important aspect of the library's mission.  Prior to 1913, the Akron Public Library had no children's department, and only a few shelves in the library were set aside to house children's books. In that year, Akron businessman Frank Mason donated $2,000 to start a collection of children's materials.

By the 1930s, the Akron Public Library had established a children's area in the Carnegie Library building and was offering regular programs for children. Children's Librarian Harriet Leaf, affectionately known as “The Story Lady” was largely responsible for creating the model that exists today for services to children at the Akron-Summit County Public Library. The Children's Library and Teen Division at Main Library, all of our branches, and Mobile Services continue the tradition of providing a variety of services to young people of all ages, including such activities as story hours for toddlers, summer reading clubs for older children, and break dancing workshops for teens.

Teen Services throughout the system offer study resources, educational support and a wide range of activities for youth.  Over the years, a wide variety of children's programming has emerged throughout the system.  Special attention has been paid to developing a Children's Library at Main, with a Resource lab for Early Childhood Educators Center (RECE).  Caregivers and educators make use of the Lab and its equipment, and materials geared to assist in the education of young children. The library also takes a lead role with This City Reads in addressing literacy issues and providing access to technology, computer programs and electronic services while collaborating with school districts and home schooling associations throughout Summit County.

Art at the Library
The Akron-Summit County Public Library has maintained a commitment to supporting local artists by acquiring and installing their works at Main Library and its branches.  As Main Library was being planned and constructed, local artists were commissioned to create works to be permanently installed in the new building.

The collection was acquired for the library by interior designer, Mrs. Luke Lietzke and funded through donations from clubs, companies, and individuals, .  Mrs. Lietzke worked closely with architects Tuchman-Canute to acquire art and select locations within the Library that would be best suited for each piece.  In 1969, when Main Library opened, the total collection was valued at $70,000.

Before the Main Library underwent its expansion in 1999, all of the artwork that could be removed from the building was taken to an art conservation facility for storage. The architect, Gwathmey Siegel designed some spaces specifically to accommodate the larger pieces. Much of the original artwork, as well as some new pieces may be found today in the newly renovated building which opened in October 2004.

In 1997, the Akron-Summit County Public Library committed to renovating or replacing each of its branches.  Each of these buildings house interesting works of art that were specifically designed with that particular building in mind. Because the library has a history of supporting local artists by acquiring and installing their works at Main Library and all branches, as renovations took place, local artists were commissioned to create works of art that were designed and installed specifically at Main Library and each branch.

Akron Art Library
The Akron Art Library is located on the Second Floor of Main Library at 60 South High Street, Akron, Ohio, 44326, and also at the Ellet Branch, the North Hill Branch, and the Odom Boulevard Branch. The Akron Art Library is a project of the Akron Art Museum in partnership with the Akron-Summit County Public Library.

Project LEARN of Summit County
Project LEARN of Summit County and the Project LEARN of Summit County Training Room are located in Main Library at 60 South High Street, Akron, Ohio 44326. The Project LEARN of Summit County is located on the Lower Floor of Main Library and the Project LEARN of Summit County Training Room is located on the First Floor of Main Library.

Mobile Services
Mobile Services is located on the Lower Floor of Main Library at 60 South High Street, Akron, Ohio, 44326. This area is not open to the general public, and is accessible only to library staff. Mobile Services consists of two bookmobiles, a van, and a Library Express Delivery Service.

Mobile Services History
The library's outreach services began in 1946, with bookmobile service to rural communities. Today, Mobile Services continues to extend library services beyond library buildings to children and adults in a number of different settings. Two bookmobiles visit schools, daycare centers, Head Start programs, and neighborhoods during the school year and in the summer. A van serves many senior citizens’ housing facilities and apartments using carts of materials brought inside to residents. Nursing homes and other residential facilities receive monthly deliveries of library materials.  Mobile Services supports the men and women's libraries at the Summit County Jail and provides regular service to other correctional facilities for both adults and children. The Library Express Delivery Service (LEDS) provides library materials to the homebound via U.S. Postal Service. Postage is paid both ways by the Library.

Branch Libraries
The Akron-Summit County Public Library has 18 branch libraries located throughout the city of Akron and Summit County:
 

 Ellet Branch Library: 2470 East Market Street, Akron, Ohio, 44312
 Fairlawn–Bath Branch Library: 3101 Smith Road, Akron, Ohio, 44333
 Firestone Park Branch Library: 1486 Aster Avenue, Akron, Ohio, 44301
 Goodyear Branch Library: 60 Goodyear Boulevard, Akron, Ohio, 44305
 Green Branch Library: 4046 Massillon Road, Uniontown, Ohio, 44685
 Highland Square Branch Library: 807 West Market Street, Akron, Ohio, 44303
 Kenmore Branch Library: 969 Kenmore Boulevard, Akron, Ohio, 44314
 Maple Valley Branch Library: 1187 Copley Road, Akron, Ohio, 44320
 Mogadore Branch Library: 144 South Cleveland Avenue, Mogadore, Ohio, 44260 
 Nordonia Hills Branch Library: 9458 Olde Eight Road, Northfield, Ohio, 44067
 North Hill Branch Library: 183 East Cuyahoga Falls Avenue, Akron, Ohio, 44310
 Northwest Akron Branch Library: 1720 Shatto Avenue, Akron, Ohio, 44313
 Norton Branch Library: 3930 South Cleveland-Massillon Road, Norton, Ohio, 44203
 Odom Boulevard Branch Library: 600 Vernon Odom Boulevard, Akron, Ohio, 44307
 Portage Lakes Branch Library: 4261 Manchester Road, Akron, Ohio, 44319
 Richfield Branch Library: 3761 South Grant Street, Richfield, Ohio, 44286
 Springfield–Lakemore Branch Library: 1500 Canton Road Suite 360, Akron, Ohio, 44312
 Tallmadge Branch Library: 90 Community Road, Tallmadge, Ohio, 44278

Branch Libraries History
East Branch Library (now known as the Goodyear Branch Library), the first branch library to have its own building, was constructed in 1939.  Prior to that, branch libraries were in locations as diverse as the Firestone Tire and Rubber Company's recreational hall, a department store, a church, and a local school. Sixteen of the branch libraries were replaced and one branch (Goodyear) underwent extensive renovations between 1999 and 2008 to accommodate the growing needs of current residents throughout Akron and Summit County. In 2018, the eighteenth and newest branch, the Springfield-Lakemore Branch, opened in Lakemore Plaza.

About the Branch Libraries
Services that are available at the branch libraries include black and white and color photocopiers/printers; laminating machines; scanners; fax machines; and 12 public access computers at each branch. The branch libraries will also be getting self-checkout kiosks (coming sometime in the near future).

Service Area
The Akron-Summit County Public Library is considered to be a county library system with branch libraries throughout the City of Akron, and in cities, towns and villages throughout Summit County, but it does not have branch libraries in Barberton, Cuyahoga Falls, Hudson, Peninsula, Stow-Munroe Falls, or Twinsburg which are serviced by their own smaller independent libraries.

References

External links
 Akron-Summit County Public Library home page
 Gwathmey Siegel Akron-Summit County Public Library project page
 Library History Digital Exhibit
 Summit memory (gives a more detailed history of the library up to 1994)

Public libraries in Ohio
Education in Summit County, Ohio
Library buildings completed in 1904
Library buildings completed in 1969
Library buildings completed in 2004